J24 may refer to:

Vehicles 
 J/24, a keelboat
 FVM J24, a Swedish fighter aircraft
 , a Halcyon-class minesweeper of the Royal Navy
 LNER Class J24, a British steam locomotive class

Other uses 
 Gyroelongated pentagonal cupola, a Johnson solid (J24)
 Johor State Route J24, a road in Malaysia